Jung Sang-hoon (born September 9, 1976) is a South Korean actor. He is known for being a cast member on the TV show Saturday Night Live Korea.

Filmography

Film

Television series

Web series

Variety show

Theater

Awards and nominations

References

External links

1978 births
Living people
20th-century South Korean male actors
21st-century South Korean male actors
South Korean male television actors
South Korean male film actors
South Korean male stage actors
South Korean male musical theatre actors
South Korean male web series actors
Seoul Institute of the Arts alumni